Ons Jabeur was the defending champion, having won the event in 2013, but chose not to participate.

Wang Qiang won the title, defeating Eri Hozumi in the final, 6–3, 6–1.

Seeds

Main draw

Finals

Top half

Bottom half

References 
 Main draw

Kurume Best Amenity Cup - Singles
Kurume Best Amenity Cup